Glow is the ninth full-length album by the band Raven, released in 1994 (see 1994 in music).

"The Rocker" is a Thin Lizzy cover.

Track listing
All songs by Gallagher, Gallagher, Hasselvander unless noted.
"Watch You Drown" – 4:36
"Spite" – 2:26
"True Believer" – 4:42
"So Close" – 4:14
"Alter" – 4:33
"The Dark Side" – 3:52
"The Rocker" (Phil Lynott, Brian Downey, Eric Bell) – 3:07
"Turn on You" – 3:43
"Far and Wide" – 5:21
"Victim" – 3:51
"Gimme a Reason" – 4:02
"Slip Away" – 4:04

Personnel
John Gallagher - bass, vocals
Mark Gallagher - guitar
Joe Hasselvander - drums

References

1994 albums
Raven (British band) albums
SPV/Steamhammer albums